Pieter van der Westhuizen, SSAS, SM, MMM (born 24 December 1937) was a South African Army officer who served as the Chief of Staff Intelligence from 1978 - 1985 and later Secretary of the State Security Council.

Background 

He joined the South African Army as a Lieutenant in 1959, and would later serve as a troop commander at the 1 Special Service Battalion and later as company commander at 2 South African Infantry Battalion. In 1964, he was appointed to the Infantry School as an instructor. By 1968, he was appointed as a staff officer  at the Directorate of Military Intelligence. He completed the French Command & Staff Course in the sixties and was appointed the Commandant Army College in 1974.

He commanded Northern Transvaal Command before becoming a Director of Collection at Directorate Military Intelligence in 1976. He was appointed Chief of Staff Intelligence in June 1978. He held that position until 1985 before becoming the Secretary of the State Security Council until 1988.

Awards and decorations

References

South African Army generals
1936 births
Ambassadors of South Africa to Chile
Living people